Arne Larsson (30 December 1934 – 26 April 1994) was a Swedish football and bandy player, known for representing Hammarby IF in both sports. He won three caps for the Sweden national football team.

Athletic career

Football

Club career
Larsson was born in Stockholm and started to play football with local club Mälarhöjdens IK in the Swedish lower divisions.

In 1957, at age 23, Larsson joined Hammarby IF in Division 2. He won a promotion to Allsvenskan in his first season with the club.

He was known as tall, elegant and reliable centre-back or full-back. Larsson played six seasons for Hammarby in Allsvenskan, Sweden's top tier, and made a total of 138 league appearances for the club, before retiring in 1965.

International career
Between 1959 and 1960, Larsson won three caps for the Swedish national team; playing in two friendlies against Finland and one against Hungary.

Bandy
Larsson also played bandy for Hammarby IF for one season in 1959–60.

Personal life
Long after has his playing career had ended, in the beginning of the 1990s, Arne Larsson was the chairman of the football section of Hammarby.

References

External links

1934 births
1994 deaths
Association football defenders
Swedish footballers
Swedish bandy players
Footballers from Stockholm
Hammarby Fotboll players
Allsvenskan players
Hammarby IF Bandy players
Sweden international footballers
Hammarby Fotboll directors and chairmen